Dornbusch can mean:
Dornbusch (Frankfurt am Main)
Dornbusch (Hiddensee), a natural region on the German Baltic Sea island of Hiddensee
Rudi Dornbusch